These are the official results of the 2010 Ibero-American Championships in Athletics which took place on June 4–6, 2010 in San Fernando, Spain.

Men's results

100 meters

Heats – June 4Wind:Heat 1: -0.8 m/s, Heat 2: -1.0 m/s, Heat 3: +0.1 m/s

Final – June 4Wind:-0.2 m/s

Extra – June 4Wind:+0.5 m/s

200 meters

Heats – June 5Wind:Heat 1: -0.1 m/s, Heat 2: -0.6 m/s, Heat 3: -0.6 m/s

Final – June 6Wind:+0.2 m/s

400 meters

Heats – June 4

Final – June 5

800 meters
June 6

1500 meters
June 5

3000 meters
June 6

5000 meters
June 4

110 meters hurdles

Heats – June 5Wind:Heat 1: -0.7 m/s, Heat 2: 0.0 m/s

Final – June 6Wind:+0.1 m/s

400 meters hurdles

Heats – June 4

Final – June 5

3000 meters steeplechase
June 5

4 x 100 meters relay
June 5

4 x 400 meters relay
June 6

20,000 meters walk
June 5

High jump
June 5

Pole vault
June 5

Long jump
June 6

Triple jump
June 4

Shot put
June 4

Discus throw
June 5

Hammer throw
June 4

Javelin throw
June 6

Decathlon
June 4–5

Women's results

100 meters

Heats – June 4Wind:Heat 1: +0.1 m/s, Heat 2: +0.8 m/s

Final – June 4Wind:+0.1 m/s

Extra – June 4Wind:+0.6 m/s

200 meters

Heats – June 5Wind:Heat 1: -1.1 m/s, Heat 2: -1.5 m/s

Final – June 6Wind:+0.5 m/s

400 meters

Heats – June 4

Final – June 5

Extra – June 4

800 meters

Heats – June 4

Final – June 6

1500 meters
June 5

3000 meters
June 6

5000 meters
June 5

100 meters hurdles

Heats – June 5Wind:Heat 1: -0.6 m/s, Heat 2: -0.6 m/s, Heat 3: -0.1 m/s

Final – June 6Wind:+0.5 m/s

400 meters hurdles

Heats – June 4

Final – June 5

3000 meters steeplechase
June 4

4 x 100 meters relay
June 5

4 x 400 meters relay
June 6

10,000 meters walk
June 4

High jump
June 6

Pole vault
June 4

Long jump
June 4

Triple jump
June 5

Shot put
June 5

Discus throw
June 6

Hammer throw
June 4

Javelin throw
June 5

Heptathlon
June 4–5

References

Ibero-American Championships
Events at the Ibero-American Championships in Athletics